Digah or Digyakh or Dygya may refer to:
Digah, Absheron, Azerbaijan
Digah, Lankaran, Azerbaijan
Digah, Lerik, Azerbaijan
Digah, Masally, Azerbaijan
Digah, Quba, Azerbaijan
Digah, Ərməki, Quba Rayon, Azerbaijan